Amphidromus coeruleus is a species of air-breathing land snail, a terrestrial pulmonate gastropod mollusk in the family Camaenidae.

Distribution 
Amphidromus coeruleus occurs on Borneo.

References

coeruleus
Gastropods of Asia
Endemic fauna of Borneo
Gastropods described in 1932
Taxa named by William J. Clench